The wandering skipper (Panoquina errans) is a species of butterfly in the family Hesperiidae. It is found in Mexico and the United States.

The larvae feed on Distichlis spicata.

Sources

Panoquina
Butterflies of North America
Near threatened animals
Butterflies described in 1892
Taxonomy articles created by Polbot